Mørdrup halt is a railway halt serving the village of Mørdrup in the western part of Espergærde south of the city of Helsingør in North Zealand, Denmark.

The halt is located on the Little North Line from Helsingør to Hillerød. The train services are currently operated by the railway company Lokaltog which runs frequent local train services between Helsingør station and Hillerød station.

See also
 List of railway stations in Denmark

External links
Lokaltog

Railway stations in the Capital Region of Denmark
Railway stations opened in 1934
1934 establishments in Denmark
Railway stations in Denmark opened in the 20th century